@ is a studio album by John Zorn and Thurston Moore. It is the first collaborative album by the duo and was recorded in New York City in February 2013 and released by Tzadik Records in September 2013.  The album consists of improvised music by Zorn and Moore that was recorded in the studio in real time with no edits or overdubs.

Reception

AllMusic said:

The Free Jazz Collective's Martin Schray called the album "absolutely fantastic". Writing shortly after the death of Lou Reed, he commented: "I guess Lou Reed would have liked this music if he had heard it, its abrasiveness, its harshness, its elegance, its sound, its diversity, its beauty."

A writer for The New Yorker described the album as "a spastic, free-jazz romp worthy of both their catalogues".

Track listing
All compositions by John Zorn and Thurston Moore
 "6th Floor Walk-Up, Waiting" – 12:25
 "Jazz Laundromat" – 4:58
 "Dawn Escape" – 9:39
 "Her Sheets" – 4:19
 "Soiled, Luscious" – 6:12
 "Strange Neighbor" – 9:45
 "For Derek and Evan" – 7:54

Personnel
 John Zorn – alto saxophone
 Thurston Moore – electric guitars

Sound
 Eric Elterman – engineer
 Marc Urselli – audio mixer
 John Zorn and Kazunori Sugiyama – producers

References

2013 albums
John Zorn albums
Albums produced by John Zorn
Thurston Moore albums
Collaborative albums
Tzadik Records albums